The 2012 Great Plains Athletic Conference football season is made up of 10 United States college athletic programs that compete in the Great Plains Athletic Conference (GPAC) under the National Association of Intercollegiate Athletics (NAIA) for the 2012 college football season.  Morningside College of Iowa completed the regular season undefeated to win the conference championship and advance to the 2012 NAIA Football National Championship.  Northwestern came in second in conference play and also qualified for the championship tournament, but lost in the first round to the Marian Knights by a score of 42–32.

Regular season

Early Games

#13 Benedictine at Concordia (NE)

Opposing team kickers Zach Keenan (Benedictine) and Kenny Zoeller (Concordia) combined to score 20 of the 82 points in this game.

Leading 9–7, Concordia fumbled in the end zone and Benedictine's Hayden Smith jumping on it for a touchdown and took a 14-9 lead.

Benedictine put on 407 yards in total offense and went 8–16 on third down, while Concordia managed 295 total offensive yards and 5–14 on third down attempts.  The final score was a victory for Benedictine 49–36.

Southwestern at #10 Northwestern (IA)

Tenth ranked Northwestern hosted the Southwestern College Moundbuilders on a Thursday night game in front of 2,347 fans.  Southwestern entered the game with optimism of a victory and breaking a losing streak.

Northwestern dominated play the entire game.  Head coach Kyle Achterhoff led his team to 649 yards and 7 touchdowns, averaging 7.1 yards per play while holding Southwestern to 156 yards and no points.  Southwestern's Ceth Bannister managed a 64-yard punt in the game as a bright spot for Southwestern.  The final score was 49–0 with Northwestern winning.

Week 1

Week 2

Week 3

Week 4

Week 5

Week 6

Week 7

Week 8

Week 9

Week 10

Week 11

Post-season

NAIA FCS Playoffs - First Round

NAIA FCS Playoffs - Quarterfinals

References

Great Plains Athletic Conference
Great Plains Athletic Conference football